The Book Cooks is the debut album by American jazz saxophonist Booker Ervin featuring performances recorded in 1960 for the Bethlehem label.

Reception
The Allmusic review by Scott Yanow awarded the album 4 stars and stated "Booker Ervin's debut as a leader teamed the intense tenor saxophonist with fellow tenor Zoot Sims".

Track listing
All compositions by Booker Ervin except as indicated
 "The Blue Book" - 8:35 
 "Git It" - 6:56 
 "Little Jane" - 6:24 
 "The Book Cooks" (Teddy Charles) - 10:42 
 "Largo" - 6:15 
 "Poor Butterfly" (John Golden, Raymond Hubbell) - 3:46 
Recorded on April 6, 1960.

Personnel
Booker Ervin - tenor saxophone
Zoot Sims - tenor saxophone
Tommy Turrentine - trumpet
Tommy Flanagan - piano
George Tucker - bass
Dannie Richmond - drums

References 

Bethlehem Records albums
Booker Ervin albums
1960 albums